Inhibitor of growth protein 1 is a protein that in humans is encoded by the ING1 gene.

Function 

This gene encodes a tumor suppressor protein that can induce cell growth arrest and apoptosis. The encoded protein is a nuclear protein that physically interacts with the tumor suppressor protein TP53 and is a component of the p53 signaling pathway. Reduced expression and rearrangement of this gene have been detected in various cancers. Multiple alternatively spliced transcript variants encoding distinct isoforms have been reported.

Location on Chromosome 13
ING1 is located near the following genes on Chromosome 13
CARKD Carbohydrate Kinase Domain-Containing Protein (Unknown Function)
 COL4A2: A2 Subunit of type IV collagen
 RAB20: Potential regulator of Connexin 43 trafficking.
 CARS2: Mitochondrial Cystienyl-tRNA Synthetase 2

Interactions 

ING1 has been shown to interact with:

 CREB binding protein, 
 DMAP1, 
 HDAC1, 
 P53, 
 PCNA, 
 SAP30, 
 SIN3A, 
 SMARCA4, and
 SMARCC1.

References

Further reading

External links 
 

Transcription factors